G. K. Shetty Hindu Vidyalaya Matriculation Higher Secondary School is located in Adambakkam, a suburb of Chennai in Tamil Nadu, India .

History 
The school was founded in 1979 following the donation of the land by Royapuram Trust and was later developed further on ground donated by Sri S.J.Pothi, retired from UNO. The donations from G.K.Shetty led to the improvement and construction of a fully fledged school premises. The School received the ISO-9001:2000 certification in 2006. View Certificate.

Awards 
The correspondent of the school Smt. Girija Seshadri, who is also the principal of Jaigopal Garodia Hindu Vidyalaya Matric H.S. School, West Mambalam, was bestowed 

National Best Teacher Award in 2002. The award was presented by the President of India Hon. Dr. A.P.J.Abdul Kalam
Dr.Radhakrishnan award for the best teacher on 5 Sept 1997 by the Tamil Nadu Government. The award was presented by the Hon'ble Chief Minister of Tamil Nadu, Shri M Karunanidhi.
Seva RatnaA Award. The award was presented by the former President of India Dr. Shankar Dayal Sharma.

Education 
The school follows Tamil Nadu state board standards, offers education at all grades starting from kindergarten to higher secondary school (12th grade) and is an English medium school.

The school offers physical education and cultural education apart from the curriculum education. Students are taught to play instruments such as mirudangam, flute, tabla, violin and harmonium. Bharathanatyam and silambam are taught to boys and girls. An educational camp is run once a year for classes 6th 7th and 8th.

Sports
This school has produced zonal winners in volleyball and ball-badminton. It provides five hours of physical training to students weekly.

Annual day
This school is famous for its annual day which mingles with Tamil culture. No cinema songs are played or nobody dances to its tunes during school day, which is a unique feature of this school in this present situation.

This school conducts a Blood Donation camp yearly.

References

External links 
 

Primary schools in Tamil Nadu
High schools and secondary schools in Tamil Nadu
Private schools in Chennai
High schools and secondary schools in Chennai
Educational institutions established in 1979
1979 establishments in Tamil Nadu